"Pleasure Boys" is a song by the British pop group Visage, released as a single on Polydor Records in October 1982.

Background
Initially a non-album single, "Pleasure Boys" was included on the Fade to Grey – The Singles Collection compilation album in 1983. As well as the standard 7" and 12" formats, the single was also released as a limited edition 7" picture disc. It was the first release by Visage after the departure of Midge Ure, who had left the group due to creative differences with Steve Strange and also to concentrate on his role in Ultravox. Possibly due to Ure's absence, "Pleasure Boys" was the first Visage single to miss the UK Top 40 after a string of five hits during the 1981-82 period.

Music video
The music video for "Pleasure Boys" was directed by Tim Pope. The black and white clip pictures Steve Strange recreating Marlon Brando's look from his 1953 film The Wild One, riding a Harley-Davidson motorbike. The clip was included on band's 1986 video release, Visage.

Track listing
 7" single (1982)
A. "Pleasure Boys" – 3:34
B. "The Anvil" – 4:26

 12" single (1982)
A. "Pleasure Boys" (Dance Mix) – 6:58
B. "The Anvil" (Dance Mix) – 6:14

Personnel
Steve Strange — vocals
Rusty Egan — electronic drums programming
Billy Currie — synthesizer
Dave Formula — synthesizer
Steve Barnacle — bass

Chart performance

References

1982 singles
Visage (band) songs
1982 songs
Songs written by Steve Strange
Songs written by Rusty Egan
Songs written by Billy Currie
Songs written by Dave Formula
Polydor Records singles